Design/Build/Fly, or DBF, is a radio-controlled aircraft competition sponsored by the American Institute of Aeronautics and Astronautics (AIAA), Cessna Aircraft Company, and Raytheon Missile Systems. The Office of Naval Research was also a sponsor until 2006. The competition is intended to challenge the AIAA student branches of each university to design, build, and fly a remote controlled airplane that can complete specific ground and flight missions. Additionally, the teams are required to submit a comprehensive design report detailing the most important aspects of their designs.

The competition rules change every year, alternating between a humanitarian mission and a military based competition. Usually, rules are published in late September and the competition fly-off is held in April. The rules define a mathematical formula used to determine the score for an entry. Recent competitions' formulas have used a combination of design report score and mission score determined by performance conducting one or more mission tasks at the fly-off.

1.The 2020 fly-off was cancelled due to the COVID-19 pandemic. Scores and rankings were solely based on the report scores.
2.The 2021 fly-off was cancelled due to the COVID-19 pandemic. Select teams were invited to submit a video presentation and demonstration of their aircraft.

Design Aspects 
Undergraduate and graduate engineering students who participate in the American Institute of Aeronautics and Astronautics (AIAA) Design/Build/Fly (DBF) competition are challenged to design, build, and fly a radio-controlled aircraft that meets specific mission requirements. The competition has been evolving with the innovations in the aerospace industry.

Students are required to keep up with changing technologies and mission requirements as the aerospace industry advances. Recent mission requirements have included increased focus on fuel efficiency, environmental sustainability, and electric propulsion. Additionally, the use of advanced materials and manufacturing techniques has become more prevalent in the competition, as students look for ways to optimize their aircraft performance while keeping costs down.

Creative designs and technological advancements are encouraged in the AIAA DBF competition, and students are given the freedom to incorporate their own ideas into their aircraft. This has led to the inclusion of new and innovative features such as aerodynamic shapes, advanced control systems, and autonomous capabilities.

Several disciplines are essential to the modern aerospace industry. The AIAA DBF competition reflects this by emphasizing team collaboration and interdisciplinary skillsets. Teams are composed of students with diverse backgrounds, including mechanical, electrical, and aerospace engineering, as well as computer science, business, and other disciplines.

Ultimately, the AIAA DBF competition continues to inspire and challenge students to stay on the forefront of innovation and creativity in the aerospace industry. With the opportunities for students to design, build, and fly their own aircraft and the emphasis on team collaboration, the AIAA DBF competition plays an important role in preparing the next generation of aerospace engineers.

Competitors in the AIAA DBF competition have access to the latest technologies and industry practices, giving them a unique opportunity to gain practical experience and build skills that are valuable in the workforce. The competition provides a platform for students to showcase their talents, network with industry professionals, and gain recognition for their achievements.

Keeping up with the latest technologies and industry practices is essential for success in the aerospace industry. The AIAA DBF competition challenges students to do just that, by providing them with an opportunity to apply their knowledge and skills to a real-world design and build project. By working in teams and solving complex engineering challenges, students develop valuable skills in project management, problem-solving, and communication.

Success in the AIAA DBF competition requires a combination of technical skill, creativity, and teamwork. Students must work together to design and build an aircraft that meets the specific mission requirements, while also staying within a limited budget and adhering to a strict timeline. The competition simulates the real-world challenges that aerospace engineers face, preparing students for future careers in the industry.

In summary, the AIAA DBF competition provides a unique opportunity for undergraduate and graduate engineering students to gain practical experience, develop valuable skills, and prepare for future careers in the aerospace industry. The competition's emphasis on innovation, teamwork, and real-world challenges makes it a valuable experience for any student looking to pursue a career in engineering or related fields.

List of Top 5 Finish by University

External links
 Home page

Aerospace engineering
Engineering competitions